Events in 2007 in anime.

Events
In this year, home video sales of anime DVDs in Japan were worth 89.4 billion yen.

Accolades
At the Mainichi Film Awards, Summer Days with Coo won the Animation Film Award and A Country Doctor won the Ōfuji Noburō Award. Tekkon Kinkreet won the Japan Academy Prize for Animation of the Year; the other nominees were Evangelion: 1.0 You Are (Not) Alone, Summer Days with Coo, Piano no Mori and Detective Conan: Jolly Roger in the Deep Azure. Internationally, 5 Centimeters Per Second won the first ever Asia Pacific Screen Award for Best Animated Feature Film, with one of the other two nominees being Summer Days with Coo.

Releases

Films
A list of anime that debuted in theaters between January 1 and December 31, 2007.

Television series
A list of anime television series that debuted between January 1 and December 31, 2007.

Original video animations
A list of original video animations that debuted between January 1 and December 31, 2007.

See also
2007 in animation

References

External links 
Japanese animated works of the year, listed in the IMDb

Years in anime
2007 in animation
2007 in Japan